Roberto Gandolfi (14 July 1956 – 18 February 2018) is an Italian former water polo player. He competed in the men's tournament at the 1984 Summer Olympics.

Personal life
Gandolfi was son of Renato Gandolfi, second goalkeeper of the Grande Torino and one of the only two survivors who miraculously escaped the Superga air disaster.

See also
 Italy men's Olympic water polo team records and statistics
 List of men's Olympic water polo tournament goalkeepers

References

External links
 

1956 births
Living people
Italian male water polo players
Water polo goalkeepers
Olympic water polo players of Italy
Water polo players at the 1984 Summer Olympics
Water polo players from Genoa